Maxime Delanghe (born 23 May 2001) is a Belgian footballer who plays as a goalkeeper for Lierse.

Club career
On 4 August 2022, Delanghe signed a one-year contract with Lierse with an option to extend for the second year.

Career statistics

Club

Notes

Honours 
PSV

 KNVB Cup: 2021–22

References

External links

 Career stats & Profile - Voetbal International

2001 births
Living people
Belgian footballers
Belgium youth international footballers
Belgian expatriate footballers
Association football goalkeepers
R.S.C. Anderlecht players
PSV Eindhoven players
Jong PSV players
Lierse Kempenzonen players
Eerste Divisie players
Challenger Pro League players
Belgian expatriate sportspeople in the Netherlands
Expatriate footballers in the Netherlands
People from Halle, Belgium
Footballers from Flemish Brabant